Patrick Shannon Flury (born March 14, 1973) is an American former professional baseball player who played in Nippon Professional Baseball and Minor League Baseball. He also played minor league ball under the Florida Marlins.  He played with the Nippon Ham Fighters for the Pacific League. He coached for the Nevada Wolf Pack baseball team.

References

External links

1973 births
Living people
American expatriate baseball players in Japan
Nevada Wolf Pack baseball coaches
Nippon Ham Fighters players
Sportspeople from Reno, Nevada
Albuquerque Isotopes players
American expatriate baseball players in Canada
Calgary Cannons players
Carolina Mudcats players
Chattanooga Lookouts players
Columbus Clippers players
Eugene Emeralds players
Indianapolis Indians players
Jupiter Hammerheads players
Norwich Navigators players
Omaha Royals players
Ottawa Lynx players
Pawtucket Red Sox players
Portland Beavers players
Rockford Royals players
Springfield Sultans players
Trenton Thunder players
Wichita Wranglers players
Wilmington Blue Rocks players
Southern Idaho Golden Eagles baseball players